Bloons TD 6 is a 2018 tower defense game developed and published by Ninja Kiwi. The sixth entry in the Bloons Tower Defense series, it first released on June 13, 2018, for iOS and Android. It was later released on Microsoft Windows in December 2018 and macOS in March 2020 via Steam. In February 2022, Bloons TD 6+ released for Apple Arcade.

Gameplay

Bloons TD 6 is a tower defense game played from a 2.5D perspective, as opposed to the 2D perspective of previous Bloons Tower Defense games, and utilizes 3D computer graphics. 

In the game, the player—who is able to team up with up to three other players in a co-op mode—creates a defense consisting of several variants of skilled monkeys, structures, and traps, in order to prevent balloon-like objects known as "Bloons" from reaching an exit. Bloons TD 6 introduces a new category of monkeys, known as "heroes", which become stronger over time. Monkeys each play a different role, and can affect Bloons in several ways, including popping them, slowing them down, or boosting the power of other monkeys. When destroyed, Bloons grant the player money, which can be used to purchase additional defenses or upgrade existing ones—upgraded monkeys gain access to new abilities. Bloons spawn in several waves, and travel along a predetermined path. Sets of waves are separated into rounds, each of which consists of a set amount of Bloons, which over time become stronger and may have properties resistant to certain effects, such as explosions, ice, or fire, with some being resistant to more than one. The largest bloons are referred to as "MOAB class" bloons, which are designed as blimps and zeppelins, are harder to defeat than other bloons due to having more health than most other bloons. If a bloon gets through the player's defenses, the player loses lives, stronger bloons taking away more lives. If the player loses all their lives, the game ends. Each round is played on a specific map, which contain obstacles and can be played on several difficulty options.

The player can earn several in-game currencies through gameplay: "Monkey Money" is rewarded for winning rounds or completed challenges and allows for additional features to be unlocked in the game, "Monkey Knowledge Points" are granted throughout gameplay and can be used to permanently upgrade monkeys via a skill tree, and "Trophies" are a rare type of currency only obtainable through weekly events, and is used to unlock special cosmetics.

History
Bloons TD 6 was first announced on PRLog on March 28, 2017, and it was initially aimed to be released in 2017. According to the same article posted on PRLog, an "extensive balance and test period" was required due to the "immense scale and strategic depth of the game".

The game was released on the iOS App Store and the Google Play Store on June 14, 2018. A Microsoft Windows version was released through Steam on December 17, 2018. Unlike earlier games of the series, Bloons TD 6 is the first game in the Bloons TD series that does not have a Flash counterpart. 

On February 11, 2022, Bloons TD 6 was released on Apple Arcade as Bloons TD 6+.

Reception

Bloons TD 6 received mostly positive reviews from critics. NZ Game Developers Association secretary Stephen Knightly praised the depth of the gameplay in Bloons TD 6, specifically the visual appeal to a general audience and the level of complexity for more experienced players: "It's fun and friendly, so it's accessible, but under the surface it's quite complicated". Although praise was given for its extended gameplay variety, it was also criticized for its lack of replayability. Because Bloons TD 6 is a paid app featuring in-app purchases that may be used to unlock certain features in the game faster, some critics argue that the game feels like it runs on a freemium model.

Harry Slater from Pocket Gamer describes the core gameplay as being too reliant on the mechanics of older games in the series, which he claims doesn't provide enough impact for players wanting to play the game long-term. On the other hand, Dennis Zirkler from GameStar believes there is a sufficient amount of content in the game to sustain a variety of different playstyles while still keeping the diversity of the core gameplay, and says the presence of in-app purchases in a paid game are completely optional for this game and make little impact on the overall enjoyment of the entire game. Although he criticizes the need to play the game repeatedly to access unlockable features, he praises the inclusion of "CHIMPS", a game mode where most unlockable features are restricted and subsequently limits players to focus on the underlying concept of creating the optimal tower combinations in each stage of the game. Nathan Snow from The Spectrum said that while being repetitive after a while, the game sticks to a proven concept of the Bloons series.

The cartoonish visuals used in the game were praised for its appeal for a wider audience, particularly through combination of playability and complexity. Critics have noted the use of characterization of towers and long-term success of the predecessor Bloons TD games as factors to the success of Bloons TD 6. Note was taken about the complexity of the game and the game mechanics accompanied with the game; PCGamesN describes the complexity of Bloons TD 6 to be given a "whole new plane of addiction" when it comes to integrating the highlighted focus of interacting monkey characters with the main gameplay, while other critics state that the implementation of such features may feel too childish or otherwise make the game appear too generic or dependent on microtransactions.

The business model for Bloons TD 6 has received mixed reviews. Simon Hill from Wired perceives the business model of the game to take into account both the premium market and the freemium market: "It’s a premium game that fully justifies the price of entry, but it also offers a wide range of microtransactions that includes the usual cosmetic upgrades, gameplay boosts, and unlimited access to special events." He also praises the balance of replayability with complexity, mainly through the deepened progression and development of strategy in a tower defense context. Further attention has been pointed towards the conventional mobile market, which generally relies on the freemium model as the primary source of income, and pointed out that Bloons TD 6 lacks third-party advertisements but varies use of optional in-app purchases in the game. Others are more critical and negative on the business model for Bloons TD 6. One critic from MetaCritic argues that the game has an overwhelming amount of content that lack sufficient replayability and uses a dubious mix of premium and freemium marketing styles.

Sales 

Bloons TD 6 topped as the top-selling app within the first week of release. According to Catherine Harris from Stuff.co.nz, the game Bloons TD 6 consistently reaches among the top-selling paid apps in the world, including the "world's most-bought paid app" in 2018. She argues that the success of this game among other Ninja Kiwi apps has helped shaped the success of New Zealand's gaming industry. Dustin Bailey from PCGamesN noted the increased popularity of the Steam version of Bloons TD 6 and the greater appearance of the game on Twitch. He attributed further success of the game by both the discounted US$1 price on the Steam version and its nostalgic factor for players who had previously played the older Flash games in the Bloons TD series.

Kotaku noted that New Zealand's gaming industry revenue surpassed that of Australia's gaming industry in 2019, with one of the main sources being from Bloons TD 6, the others being Path of Exile by Grinding Gear Games and Valleys Between by Little Lost Fox.

Legacy 

The game regularly receives updates that include constant balance changes and additional content. Ben "RidiculousHat" Goodman from PC Gamer praises the continuous development of Bloons TD 6, which regularly refines the balance in the game through updates to promote a variety of gameplay.

The success of the Bloons TD franchise had been given praise by digital investment company Modern Times Group, with special note on Ninja Kiwi's continuous work to "pioneer" the tower defense genre in an economically viable but quality format.

References

External links 
 

2018 video games
Android (operating system) games
Windows games
IOS games
Macintosh games
Tower defense video games
Monkeys in popular culture
Video games about primates
Video games developed in New Zealand
Video game sequels